Cuando Sale Un Lucero is the seventeenth album from Mexican pop music singer and actress Lucero. And her sixth album with mariachi. With this album Lucero changed label and is the first under the EMI contract. It was released on 20 October 2004 in Mexico where the sales reached gold status.

This album received the Orgullosamente Latino Award for Best Latin Album of the Year in 2005.

At the time the album sold around 80,000 copies in Mexico, being certified as gold.

Track listing
The album is composed by ten songs, all of them were arranged and composed by different composers.

Singles

Sales and certifications

Awards

References

2004 albums
Lucero (entertainer) albums